The New Democratic Party of Quebec fielded forty-one candidates in the 1994 Quebec provincial election, none of whom were elected.

Candidates
(n.c.: no candidate)

References

1994